Medan is the capital and largest city of the Indonesian province of North Sumatra, as well as a regional hub and financial centre of Sumatra. According to the National Development Planning Agency, Medan is one of the four main central cities of Indonesia, alongside Jakarta, Surabaya, and Makassar. As of the 2020 Census, Medan has a population of 2,435,252 within its city limits, and over 3.4 million in its built-up urban area, making it the fourth largest urban area in Indonesia. The Medan metropolitan area—which includes neighbouring Binjai, Deli Serdang Regency, and a part of Karo Regency—is the largest metropolitan area outside of Java, with 4,744,323 residents counted in the 2020 Census. Medan is a multicultural metropolis and a busy trading city bordered by the Strait of Malacca, making it one of the major economic cities in Indonesia. A gateway to the western part of Indonesia, Medan is supported by the Port of Belawan and Kualanamu International Airport. Both which are connected to the city centre via toll roads and railways.

The city was founded by Guru Patimpus, a Karonese man who named the area of swampy land at the confluence of Deli River and Babura river Kampung Medan Putri. It later became a part of the Deli Sultanate, established in 1632. In the late 19th century, colonial Dutch seeking new plantation areas chose Medan and Deli as the most recent plantation hubs with Deli Company. They set up tobacco plantations, transforming Medan into a trade hub within several years and earning Medan the nickname Het Land Dollar, meaning "the land of the money". The city was well known due to the importance of tobacco as an export to Europe and the West. The rapid development of Medan came with the Deli Railway, which was established for shipping tobacco, rubber, tea, timber, palm oil, and sugar from Medan to the Port of Belawan, then exported around the world. Medan was the capital of the State of East Sumatra before it became the provincial capital of North Sumatra. Medan was dubbed Parijs van Sumatra due to the city's resemblance to Paris.

Medan is a financial, trading, and economic centre for North Sumatra province and the whole of Sumatra Island. For many foreign investors, Medan is rich in culture and history and presents itself as a dynamic economic hub of the world. As the robust capital of North Sumatra, Medan offers a large pool of human capital and talent, lower operational costs, a strategic location close to Singapore and Malaysia, and diverse natural resources. The city is known as a trading hub for palm oil export. North Sumatra has approximately 4 million acres of palm oil plantations. Medan is one of the developed markets in trading. About 60% of the economy in North Sumatra is backed by trading, agriculture, and processing industries.

Etymology
According to the diary of a Portuguese merchant in the early 16th century, the name of Medan was derived from the Tamil word Maidhan, also known as Maidhāṉam (Tamil: மைதானம்), that means Ground, adopted from the Malay language. One of the Karo-Indonesia dictionaries written by Darwin Prinst SH, published in 2002, stated that Medan could also be defined as "recover" or "be better".

History

Aru Kingdom

The area in and around Medan city, Deli and Langkat Regency was the location of the ancient Kingdom of Aru (Haru). The Karo people established the kingdom and flourished between the 13th and 16th centuries. Several archaeological sites around Medan are connected to the Kingdom of Aru, including Kota Rentang in the Hamparan Perak area, Deli Serdang Regency, the Kota Cina archaeological site in Medan Marelan, and Benteng Putri Hijau, a fort ruin in Deli Tua, Namorambe, Deli Serdang Regency.

Founding of Medan

Medan started as a village called Kampung Medan (Medan Village). Kampung Medan was founded by Guru Patimpus Sembiring Pelawi, a Karonese man from the Karo Land. Before he became a Muslim, he was a Pemena follower. Following the history of trombo and Hamparan Perak (XII Kuta), Guru Patimpus studied Islam from Datuk Kota Bangun. At the time, Guru Patimpus and his people wanted to meet Datuk. Not only did they want to meet him, but they also wanted to compete with him for "power". Whenever Guru Patimpus went to Kota Bangun, he always passed Pulo Brayan. In Pulo Brayan, Guru Patimpus fell in love with the Princess of Pulo Brayan. Eventually, he married the princess and had two sons, Kolok and Kecik. The married couple then turned the forest area in the confluence between the Deli River and Babura River into a small village, naming it Kampung Medan (lit. Medan Village). The day has been marked as the date of Medan's anniversary, 1 July 1590.

Guru Patimpus sent his children to study and read the Qur'an to Datuk Kota Bangun and then sent them to Aceh to deepen their knowledge of Islam.

In the early days, the natives called the area the Land of Deli (Indonesian: Tanah Deli), starting from the Ular River to the Wampu River in Langkat. At the same time, the Deli Sultanate in power did not cover the area between the two rivers.

Early Kampung Medan was a fortress composed of two layers of round-shaped walls at a confluence between two rivers of Deli and Babura. The Administrator's house was located across the river from Kampung Medan. Kampung Medan is in the modern-day location of the Wisma Benteng building, and the Administrator house is in present-day PTP IX Deli Tobacco.

Deli Sultanate

In 1612, the Acehnese Sultan Iskandar Muda defeated the Aru Kingdom. The Acehnese appointed Hisyamsudin (later changing his name to Tuanku Gocah Pahlawan), with Laksamana Kuda Bintan as their representative in the kingdom. In 1632 Aceh established the Deli Sultanate, and Gocah Pahlawan became the first king. As the Deputy of the Sultan of Aceh and by utilizing the large size of the Aceh Sultanate, Gocah Pahlawan expanded his territory, covering the modern-day Percut Sei Tuan and Medan Deli district. He founded the villages of Gunung Barus, Sampali, Kota Bangun, Pulo Brayan, Kota Jawa, Kota Rengas and Sigara-gara. He died in 1669 and was succeeded by his son Tuangku Panglima Perunggit who moved the kingdom's centre to Labuhan Deli, which then proclaimed the independence of the Deli Sultanate from the Aceh Sultanate in 1669.

During the reign of the third king, Tuanku Panglima Paderap, the kingdom was moved to Pulo Brayan due to floods. The fourth king, Tuanku Panglima Pasutan, organized the empire into four tribes, each led by a Datuk (a Malay title for high-ranking persons). During the time of the fifth king, Tuanku Panglima Gandar Wahib, the Datuks increased their power.

The sixth ruler was Sultan Amaluddin Mengedar Alam. During his years, the Siak Sultanate became a more substantial influence in Deli than the Acehnese Sultanate, and the ruler was given the title: Sultan. The seventh ruler was Sultan Osman Perkasa Alam. During his leadership, the Deli Sultanate became autonomous.

The eighth ruler, Sultan Mahmud Al Rasyid Perkasa Alam, started relations with the Dutch. The next ruler was Sultan Ma'mun Al Rashid Perkasa Alamyah, who ruled from 1873 to 1924 when the tobacco trade expanded. He moved the kingdom's capital to Medan and finished the construction of the Maimun Palace in 1888. He also built the grand mosque of Al Ma'shun, commonly known as the Great Mosque of Medan, in 1907. He became known as the builder of early Medan in cooperation with the Dutch and Tjong Yong Hian and Tjong A Fie, two Chinese businessmen brothers and Kapitans who built a large plantation business in Deli. They brought Medan-Deli new developments, including business centres such as banks, offices, plantations, housing, a railroad and a port. The tenth Sultan, Amaluddin Al Sani Perkasa Alamsyah, expanded harbours, with commerce increasing during his reign. At the declaration of Indonesian Independence, the Sultan recognized the republic's sovereignty and was, in return, given an essential function as administrator of Deli-Malay traditions and culture.

The Sultanate of Deli still exists today, although administrative powers have been replaced with elected Mayors. The current sultan is Sultan Mahmud Lamanjiji Perkasa Alam, the 14th sultan, rulung since 2005. At age eight, he became the youngest Sultan of Deli.

Dutch East Indies era

The opening of the Suez Canal in 1869 meant more intensified traffic between Europe and the Far East. The Dutch started the shipping company Stoomvaart Maatschappij Nederland which quickly expanded to 43 steamships in 1877. The British, however, had already had 3,000 ships. A journey from Europe to Indonesia took approximately 40 days, and the trip was reduced to 23 days and 20 hours to Batavia (Jakarta). The ships also became more extensive and more comfortable.

This increased to cruise ships carrying predominantly white Europeans coming to the Dutch East Indies as tourists for a tour of the region, including Medan, the largest tobacco plantation in the Dutch East Indies at the time. To accommodate the tourists, it was deemed necessary to have European-class hotels. Therefore, in 1898, a Dutch businessman named Aeint Herman de Boer built Hotel de Boer in the northwest of the Esplanade (now Lapangan Merdeka Medan).

Exports depended on British shipping in 1890 when Sabang became a bunker harbour. Belawan got its port in 1923. The shipping company Koninklijke Paketvaart Maatschappij (KPM) was established to ship valuable Deli Company tobacco, which was sent to Batavia. This cargo was almost as valuable, and stringent rules regulated its handling. It was strictly forbidden to stow anything on top of the tobacco, and coolies were not allowed to walk on it when they worked in the hatches. 

Cleaning of roads in Medan was, until 1912, done by prisoners. After that, free coolies got the job. In 1917 the authorities started to use horse-drawn carts equipped with brooms for cleaning. In 1928 horse-drawn carts were replaced by motorized vehicles. The first newspaper was the Deli Courant, established in 1885, although it was not a daily publication. In 1898, Joseph Hallermann, a German, established the daily De Sumatra Post, which survived until 1939.

There were planters in Medan from many countries: Britain, the Netherlands, America, France, Germany, Poland, and Switzerland. Many of them became very rich and led affluent lifestyles. Medan became known as the Paris of Sumatra (lit. Parijs van Sumatra (Dutch)). Until today, the area in downtown Medan is called Polonia, a name given by a Polish aristocrat who once owned a plantation there. One area of Medan is still called Helvetia (the old name of Switzerland). A plantation owner from Switzerland gave this name.

Tobacco plantations
Medan developed rapidly in the 1860s when Dutch authorities began to release new land for tobacco plantations. Jacob Nienhuys, Van der Falk, and Elliot, Dutch tobacco merchants, pioneered the opening of the tobacco plantation in Deli. Nienhuys' previous tobacco business in Java moved to Deli after an invitation by an Arab from Surabaya named Said Abdullah Bilsagih, brother-in-law of the Deli Sultan Mahmud Perkasa Alam. Initially, Nienhuys cultivated tobacco on 4,000 hectares of land in Tanjong Spassi, near Labuhan, owned by the Sultan of Deli. In March 1864, Nienhuys sent samples of his tobacco crop to Rotterdam, Netherlands, to test its quality. The tobacco leaves were considered high quality for cigar materials. Hence Deli's name rose as a producer of the best cigar wrappers for Europeans.

The Sultan of Deli and the Dutch 1865 signed the tobacco treaty. After two years, Nienhuys, Jannsen, P.W. Clemen, and Cremer founded De Deli Maatschappijabbreviated Deli Mij in Labuhan. In 1869, Nienhuys moved the head office of Deli Mij to Kampung Medan. The new office was built on the confluence of the Deli and Babura rivers. With the transfer of the office, Medan quickly became the centre of government activity and trade, as well as an area with the most dominant development in western Indonesia. The rapid growth of the economy transformed Deli into a significant trading centre nicknamed the land dollar, the land of the dollar. Then, they opened up new plantations in the Martubung and Sunggal areas in 1869 and in Sungai Beras and Klumpang in 1875, bringing the total to 22 plantation companies in 1874. Given the activities of the tobacco trade, Kampung Medan became increasingly crowded and developed into what is now known as Medan-Deli.

The development of Medan-Deli as a trading centre was followed by it becoming a centre of government. In 1879, the Capital Assistant of Deli Residents moved from Labuhan to Medan. On 1 March 1887, the capital of the Resident of East Sumatra also moved from Bengkalis to Medan Deli Sultanate Palace, which was initially located in Kampung Bahari (Labuhan), and Pulo Brayan also moved with the completion of Maimoon Palace on 18 May 1891. Thus the Capital of Deli officially moved to Medan.

Growth of Medan-Deli

In 1915, the Residency of East Sumatra enhanced its status to Gubernermen. In 1918 the city of Medan officially became Gemeente (Municipal) with Mayor Baron Daniël Mackay. Based on the "Acte van Schenking" (Grant Deed) No. 97 Notary J.M. de-Hondt Junior, dated 30 November 1918, the Sultan of Deli handed over the land of Medan-Deli to the Gemeente, thus officially becoming the region under the direct rule of the Dutch East Indies. In the early days of this township, Medan still consisted of four villages, Kampung Kesawan, Kampung Sungai Rengas, Kampung Petisah Hulu and Kampung Petisah Hilir.

In 1918, there were 43,826 residents of Medan, made up of 409 Europeans, 35,009 Native Indonesians, 8,269 Chinese and 139 East foreigners such as Indians.

Since then, the Medan has developed more rapidly. Various facilities were built. Some of these include the Office of Experiment Stations named AVROS in Kampung Baru, now RISPA, the railway of Pangkalan Brandan – Besitang, Tirtanadi Water Tower, American Consulate, and Teacher school on Jl. H.M. Yamin now, Mingguan Soematra, Pool Association Medan, Central Market (Grote Markt), St. Elizabeth Hospital, Eye Hospital and Kebun Bunga Sports field.

Japanese occupation and post independence era

In 1942, the Japanese invaded the Dutch East Indies, arriving in Sumatra by February. Sumatra was placed under the command of the 25th Army, based in Singapore. The Japanese landed in Tanjung Tiram, Asahan and entered Medan by bicycles they bought from the people around them by bartering.

The transfer from Dutch to Japanese control was very chaotic, and the natives took this opportunity to take revenge against the Dutch. This situation was immediately brought under control by the Japanese Army by deploying the Kempetai. The Japanese changed the municipal government to Medan Sico (Municipal Government). Civil servants at the Medan municipal level were named Hoyasakhi. Following the surrender of Japan in 1945, Sumatra came under the authority of the South East Asia Command headed by British Admiral Lord Louis Mountbatten. On 17 August, Sukarno proclaimed Indonesia's independence in Jakarta and appointed Muhammad Hasan as governor of Sumatra. However, news of the proclamation was only announced by Hasan in Medan on 30 September. After allied troops landed in October, clashes with armed Republicans led to the Battle of Medan.

In December 1947, the Dutch established the State of East Sumatra with Medan as its capital in the area they controlled following Operation Product against the republicans. This became part of the United States of Indonesia but was dissolved into the unitary republic of Indonesia in 1950.

The city development remained stagnant until the 1970s, when significant developments, especially palm oil and rubber plantations, made Medan the busiest city outside Java. The transmigration program brought Javanese and Batak people to settle in the town as many people from Java and the rural province sought jobs.

From 4 to 8 May 1998, riots occurred in Medan due to the 1997 Asian financial crisis. They began when demonstrations around many campuses for nearly two months, with clashes between students and security forces, resulting in the death of a student. The next day, the mobs became bigger, targeting and attacking the business and trading sector, leading to a racial riot. Many shops and vehicles were burned and looted on several roads around the city, mostly owned by Chinese residents. As a result, a curfew was imposed for more than two weeks until peace returned.

On 5 September 2005, Mandala Airlines Flight 091 crashed a minute after takeoff from the old Polonia International Airport from Medan to Jakarta. The aircraft stalled and crashed into a heavily populated residential area along Djamin Ginting road in Padang Bulan. Of the 117 passengers and crews on board, only 17 survived, and an additional 49 civilians on the ground were killed. This flight accident led to the move to the newly built airport in Deli Serdang, which was completed in 2012, named Kualanamu International Airport. The move to the new airport relaxed height restriction laws in the city.

Geography
Medan is in the northeastern part of Sumatra island, in North Sumatra province. Medan is a semi-enclave within Deli Serdang Regency, as Medan is bordered by Deli Serdang in the south, east, and west, while Medan borders with the Strait of Malacca in the north.

Medan lies on the Deli River and Babura River banks, which feed into a naturally sheltered harbour and then into the Straits of Malacca. It has helped the city grow in significance as a trading port. Medan is close to the Barisan Mountains, located in the southern part of the city and close to volcanoes such as Sibayak Mountain and Sinabung Mountain  from the city.

Climate
Under the Köppen climate classification, Medan features a tropical rainforest climate (Af) with no real dry season. However, Medan has noticeably wetter and drier months, with its driest month (January) on average seeing about one-third of its wettest month (October)—temperatures in the city average approximately  throughout the year.

Located in the central part of Deli Serdang Regency, Medan is surrounded by satellite cities and towns such as Binjai, Lubuk Pakam, Tanjung Morawa, Tembung, Percut Sei Tuan, and Labuhan Deli, which help the city become a new urban area in Indonesia which known as 'Mebidang' (Medan, Binjai, Deli Serdang).

Governance

Mayor

Medan was governed by Mayor Dr H. Abdillah Ak, MBA, from 2005–2010. However, Indonesian Corruption Eradication Commission officials caught Abdillah and his vice mayor in 2008. Syamsul Arifin, the Governor of North Sumatra Province, appointed Affifudin Lubis as the acting mayor. In 2009, Affifudin Lubis resigned, and the Governor appointed Rahudman Harahap as a replacement. Because Rahudman wanted to be a candidate in the 2010 mayoral election, he, too, resigned from office. Left with no choice, Syamsul Arifin himself became the acting mayor. In the 2010 mayoral election, Rahudman Harahap won the election. However, Rahudman was then arrested due to corruption, resulting in his deputy Dzulmi Eldin officially becoming the acting mayor. In February 2016, Dzulmi won the election and became the mayor for five years (2016–2021). Currently, Medan is led by Bobby Nasution as a mayor and Aulia Rachman as a vice mayor.

Administrative divisions

Medan is divided into 21 districts , tabulated below with their areas and populations at the 2010 Census, and the 2020 Census. The table also includes the number of administrative villages (urban kelurahan) in each district and their postal codes.

The city is centralised around Medan Petisah, Medan Baru, Medan Polonia, Medan Maimun, Medan Kota, and Medan Barat (West Medan), which act as the city centres. Medan Labuhan is one of the largest districts by area (together with Medan Belawan and Medan Marelan) and lies in the northern part of the city. Medan Tuntungan serves as the gateway to Karo Regency, Medan Helvetia to Binjai City and Langkat, and Medan Amplas to Tebing Tinggi and Pematang Siantar.

The 21 districts are subdivided into 151 neighbourhoods or urban villages (kelurahan).

Demographics
The city is Indonesia's fourth most populous after Jakarta, Surabaya and Bandung, and Indonesia's largest city outside Java island. The population within the city's borders has risen from 568,000 in 1968 fourfold to 2.1 million in 2010 and rose again to 2,435,252 at the 2020 Census. Much of the population lies outside its city limits, especially in Deli Serdang Regency. The official Metropolitan area (Wilayah Metropolitan Medan) was inhabited by 4,220,439 people in 2010 but had risen to 4,744,323 in 2020. 

The four districts of Karo Regency within the metropolitan area are Merdaka, Berastagi, Dolat Rayat and Barusjahe.

Ethnicities and languages
Batak (including Mandailing and Karo people) and Javanese are the major ethnic groups in Medan, along with Chinese, Minangkabau and Malay populations and smaller groups of Acehnese, Indians, Nias, and Sundanese people. Medan also has foreign residents from India, Sri Lanka, Bangladesh, Thailand, China, Taiwan, the Middle East and other Asian countries.

The city has diverse communities, reflected by its history. The Bataks are one of the major ethnic groups in Medan, with three Batak subethnicities residing in the town, including the Toba, Karo and Mandailing Bataks. The Karo people are the natives of Medan. Meanwhile, the Dutch employed the Toba people as workers in oil palm plantations. Lastly, the Mandailing people came in masses after independence to find better jobs. The Bataks reside throughout the city, while the Karo people reside around southern areas such as Padang Bulan, Medan Johor and Tuntungan. Toba Batak people reside in Marindal and Amplas; many live in nearby city centres, such as the Medan Perjuangan district, while the Mandailing people mainly reside in Medan Tembung. Bataknese languages are diversified; the primary Batak language in Medan are Batak and Karo.

In addition, there is a large ethnic Javanese community, primarily composed of descendants of people transported from Java in the last 19th century to be employed as contract workers at various plantations in North Sumatra. They are usually called Pujakesuma (Indonesian: Putra Jawa Kelahiran Sumatera, English: Sumatra-born Javanese). Various Javanese toponymies can mark their presence in Medan in Medan, such as Tanjungsari, Sarirejo, Sidodadi, Sidorejo, etc. (mainly in East Medan and Medan Tembung area); most of them speak Javanese with its local variation. The Malays are also natives of Medan, already living in outskirt areas such as Belawan and Labuhan since the Aru era as fishermen. They came to the city after Deli Sultanate's new palace was established in the 18th century. Over time, the Malays spread throughout the city, with the most significant concentration of people living in Medan Maimun, Kota Matsum, Labuhan and Belawan, many of them speaking Malay.

A prominent component of the city population is many Chinese who migrated from southern China to Deli in the 16th century, with mass migration occurring in the last 19th and early 20th century for those seeking employment as planters and coolies. Medan is home to the largest Chinese community on Sumatra island; they are active in business and trading activities, contributing significantly to the city's economy. Unlike the Java-born Chinese, most Chinese people in Medan speak fluent Hokkien, a dialect originating from Fujian, a province in the southern part of China. They also made their variation of Hokkien, which is called Medan Hokkien, with borrowed many local words. Many also speak Mandarin, Teochew, and Cantonese, depending on the language of their ancestors. The Chinese reside throughout the city, but most live around the city centre. The city also hosts a sizable community of Indian Indonesian, mostly Tamil descendants, commonly known as Madrasis or Tamilan. A well-known Tamil neighbourhood is Kampung Madras, which is located in the city centre and is heralded as one of the busiest parts of the city, other minor Indian ethnics are also present such as Punjabi, Malayali and Telugu, the primary language among Indians in Medan are Tamil and English, beside Bahasa Indonesia, some of them are also fluent in Punjabi, Malayalam and Telugu.

Minangkabaus are merchants, peddlers, artisans, and white-collar workers such as doctors, lawyers, and journalists. Minangkabau restaurants, known as Padang Restaurants, are scattered throughout the city. The Minang people came to Medan in the mid-19th century. From the 1960s to the 1980s, the number of Minangkabau people migrating to Medan surged and formed 8.6% of the population in the city. Most of the Minangkabaus living around Medan Denai and Medan Maimun area speak Minangkabau.  Acehnese are other minority ethnicities in Medan. Many Aceh people mostly came after the conflict in Aceh in the late 1970s when they sought sanctuary. Today, they are known for working as merchants such as grocery store operators and can be found in Mie Aceh restaurants around Setia Budi and Ring Road/Sunggal areas. Most Aceh people speak Acehnese, and Gayonese also exists among them.

Even though many languages exist in Medan, most of them communicate with each other with their slang, called Bahasa Medan or Dialek Medan (Medanese slang), made from Bahasa Indonesia with various words taken from its respective ethnics, mainly from the Malay language, the sounds of Medanese slang are pretty loud and harsh that sometimes offends their listeners.

Religion

Most of Medan's inhabitants are Muslim, comprising approximately 66 per cent of the total population. There is a large significant Christian population of around 25 per cent, including Catholic, with various denominations including the Batak Christian Protestant Church, Methodist and Lutheran. Buddhists follow about 9 per cent, and smaller numbers of Hindus, Confucianism, and Sikhism also exist in the city. Medan hosts diversified houses of worship, including a mosque, church, cathedral, Buddhist temple (vihara/wat), Hindu temple (koil/pura), Taoist temple, and gurdwaras.

Islam is followed by the Malay, Minangkabau, Javanese, Mandailing-Angkola and Achehnese people, while the Bataknese majority follows Christianity. There are also Bataknese following the traditional religion, such as Pemena and Parmalim. Buddhism is a significant religion for the Chinese, while a small community follows Confucianism and Christianity. Meanwhile, Hinduism ais mostly followed by the Indians.

Economy

Medan is one of the largest metropolitan cities in Indonesia and has become the centre of growth in the province of North Sumatra. The city is an important commercial and economic hub of Indonesia. Locals and many foreigners have set up their businesses to take advantage of its dynamism and boost its economy. Medan's economy was mainly based on tobacco, rubber, tea, palm and coffee culture and production. However, growing manufacturing sectors such as automotive, machinery production, tiles, paper and pulp, etc., also currently contribute to the city's economy.

With the enactment of Government Regulation No 28/2008, this metropolitan area has been recognized as one of the Indonesian National Strategic Regions (Indonesian: Kawasan Strategis Nasional or KSN). Since then, Medan City has continued to support a large portion of regional trade and logistic flow across the municipalities within this particular KSN and most of the western part of Indonesia (RTR Metropolitan Mebidangro, 2012). Currently, Medan is the centre point for crop trading for different commodities produced in the region, such as rubber, palm oil, cinnamon, tobacco, tea, and coffee, a significant portion of which have been exported to Europe, North America, and the Middle East. In the global context, Medan's geographical advantages have also played essential parts within a triangle alliance with Malaysia and Thailand (Indonesia–Malaysia–Thailand Growth Triangle or IMT-GT) that enables mutual partnerships in tourism, commerce, culture, health, and education among the three countries.

Medan is one of the most industrialized cities in Sumatra, consisting of many small, medium and large-scale enterprises. Because of its location and proximity to Singapore and Kuala Lumpur, it functions strategically as the main gateway for trading goods and financial services on domestic, regional and international levels in the western region of Indonesia. Many multinational companies maintain offices in the city, namely Asian Agri, London Sumatra, Musim Mas, Philips Lighting, Toba Pulp Lestari, Marriott, Wilmar, ABB Group and DBS Bank, etc.

Medan is one of Indonesia's most promising property markets outside Java, and several high-value developments have transformed its property market – and skyline. Many of the country's big property developers are building condominiums, hotels, office towers and shopping malls in the city. Medan is also known as the "City of Million Shophouses", as most of the population work in the trade sector, opening shops near their houses. In recent years, the city has undergone rapid development, which made the residential property prices in Medan trend upward. Lamudi, a worldwide real estate portal, recognized Medan as one of six cities in Asia to feature and preserve several colonial architectural sites while accompanying its growth as a metropolitan city.

Medan is one of the largest metropolitan cities in Indonesia and has become the centre of change in the province of North Sumatra. The city is an important commercial and economic hub of Indonesia. Locals and many foreigners have set up their businesses to take advantage of its dynamism and boost its economy. Medan's economy was mainly based on tobacco, rubber, tea, palm and coffee culture and production. However, growing manufacturing sectors such as automotive, machinery production, tiles, paper and pulp, etc., also currently contribute to the city's economy.

Culture
Many different ethnic groups inhabit Medan. Malay people are the natives of the Medan area and have deep roots in Medan. They began ruling there during the Deli Sultanate until now. The empire has many lands and properties of heritage in Medan, such as a palace, a mosque, and a park. The Dutch contributed significantly to city development, including many historical buildings made by Dutch and Peranakan architecture along Jalan Kesawan and Pemuda during the Dutch East Indies era. The arrival of Minangkabaus, Bataks, Javanese, Chinese and Indian people brought more colours to the culture of Medan, especially cuisine.

In addition to food culture, the migrants also brought the story-writing culture, which was known as Roman Medan in the 1930s-1940s. Romance novels by Medan writers usually tell the story of the life of the people in Deli (Medan and its surroundings). Several romance novel writers grew up in Medan, including Hamka, Joesoef Souyb, Tamar Djaja, Matu Mona, and A. Damhoeri.

Museum

The North Sumatra Museum has located approximately 4 km (2.5 mi) south of the city's centre in Jalan HM. Joni 15 Medan. The Minister of Education and Culture, Dr Daoed Joesoef, opened the museum in April 1982. It is mainly centred around North Sumatran ethnic groups and artefacts.

The Bukit Barisan Museum is a military museum opened by Brigade General Leo Lopulisa on 21 June 1971. The museum is located at 8 Jalan H. Zainul Arifin. It houses several historic weapons, including weapons used in the struggle for independence and the revolt in North Sumatra in 1958. Motives/paintings of the rebellion against the Netherlands were presented.

The Rahmat International Wildlife Museum & Gallery, or the Rahmat Gallery, opened in 1999 and is considered the city's outstanding taxidermy collection. It is located on Jalan Letjen S. Parman No.309.

Cuisine

Because of its multiculturality, Medan has various cuisines ranging from local, western, eastern and southern Asian, and middle eastern cuisine. The city also hosts a lot of cafes, restaurants, food centres and street vendors with varying price points.

Nelayan, a famous restaurant in Medan, serves halal-Chinese seafood and dim sum. Garuda and Uda Sayang are the most popular Minangkabau restaurant in Medan, which helps nasi padang and gulai. Meanwhile, Sate Afrizal Amir is one of the best sate padang in Medan. Cahaya Baru is an Indian restaurant on Kampung Madras with chapati and tandoori as its most recommended food. The most visited Batak restaurant are OnDo Batak grill and Tesalonika known best for their babi panggang (grilled pork) and saksang.

This city is known as "the culinary heaven of Indonesia", as Medan is prominent for its street hawkers offering a variety of cheap local delicacies. Medan has several well-known culinary spots, such as Jalan Selat Panjang and Jalan Semarang for Chinese food, Jalan Pagaruyung for Indian and Malay food and Jalan Padang Bulan for Batak food.

Merdeka Walk is Indonesia's first tensile structure (alfresco outdoor concept), filled with various cafés and restaurants. Durian is a popular fruit in Indonesia and nowhere more so than Medan. With its distinctive taste and smell, this thorny fruit is available all over the city. Ucok Durian along Jalan Iskandar Muda is the most known durian stall in the town.

Soto Medan is a savoury stew made with various types of meat (including innards) that are fried beforehand and coconut milk. It is usually served with rice and a piece of potato croquette (perkedel).

Bika Ambon is a famous local dessert. Made from tapioca flour, eggs, sugar, yeast and coconut milk. Bika Ambon is generally sold in pandan flavours, although other flavours such as banana, durian, cheese, and chocolate are also available. Bika Ambon Zulaikha is the most known bika ambon seller and has several branches in the city.

Babi Panggang Karo, often called BPK, is grilled pork with its blood curd used as a dipping sauce. It is usually served with plain rice and sambal andaliman, a spicy condiment made from local Sichuan peppers. The Chinese equivalent of grilled pork is called Cha Sio (叉烧)

Tau Kua He Ci (豆干虾炸), also known as Lap Choi (腊菜), is the local Chinese version of Rojak (often pronounced ru-jak) but made with fried prawn, vegetables and tofu with chilli sauce. Its other name is also calledTeng-Teng (丁丁) is a candy made with peanuts.

Dried fruits and many unique cuisines can be found in Pasar Rame, which operates daily from morning to afternoon, just beside Thamrin Plaza.

Bolu Meranti is Medan's most famous homemade Swiss roll, which local tourists frequently buy as a souvenir. The Medanese dried anchovies are also one of Medan's "must" souvenirs, which can be purchased from Pusat Pasar (Central Market).

Tourism

Landmarks

Many old buildings in Medan still retain their Dutch architecture. These include the old City Hall, the Medan Post Office, Inna Dharma Deli Hotel, Titi Gantung (a bridge over the railway), The London Sumatra building, the Tjong A Fie Mansion, AVROS, Warenhuis, and The Tirtanadi Water Tower, mainly located around the old town Kesawan.

There are several historical places such as Maimoon Palace, built in 1887–1891, where the Sultan of Deli still lives (the Sultan no longer holds any official power), The Great Mosque of Medan, built-in 1906 in the Moroccan style by the Dutch architect A.J. Dingemans. Both Maimoon Palace and The Great Mosque are close—the Mosque is located at Jalan Sisingamangaraja, and The Palace is located at Jalan Brigjen Katamso.

Gunung Timur Temple, locally known as Tông-Yuk-Kuàng in Hokkien, is the city's oldest Taoism temple on Jalan Hang Tuah. Medan has a Buddhist temple named Maha Vihara Maitreya and a Buddhist centre nearby called Maha Karuna Buddhist Centre (MKBC). This temple complex is one of Indonesia's most prominent non-historical Buddhist temples, both situated around the Cemara Asri housing complex. Medan Cathedral is the oldest church in the city, it was built by the Dutch and Indian community nearby, and the church was named Indische Kerk back then, located in the old town along Jalan Pemuda. Sri Mariamman Temple is the first Hindu temple in Medan, built around 1881 by The Tamil people in the city; located on Jalan Zainul Arifin, The city's Little India or more known as Kampung Madras, the temple has unique south Indian architecture with hundred Hindu deity statues around the building.

In 2005, a Catholic church named Graha Maria Annai Velangkanni was built in an Indo-Mogul style, devoted to Mary; the particular Saint knows its origin with an apparition in 17th century Tamil Nadu, India. The temple has two stories and a small tower of seven novels. It is situated on Jalan Sakura III, besides the outer ring road on Jalan TB Simatupang.

Shopping centre
Medan is one of the major shopping centres of Indonesia, along with Jakarta, Bandung and Surabaya.

Medan also has several modern shopping malls:
Cambridge City Square
Centre Point
DeliPark Mall
Focal Point
Lippo Plaza Mall
Manhattan Times Square

 Medan Mall

 Plaza Medan Fair

Ringroad City Walks
Sun Plaza
Thamrin Plaza

Theme parks
There are some theme parks in or outside the city, and most are water parks.
HillPark GreenHill City – the latest theme park an hour from Medan on the way to Berastagi.
Pantai Cermin Themepark – the first and only water theme park in North Sumatra, located in Cermin Beach, Serdang Bedagai. A Malaysian Investor and the Local Government organize the theme park.
Wonder Water World – the latest water park in Medan, located in Central Business District Polonia.
Hairos Water Park – another water park near the city, located on Jalan Djamin Ginting Km.14, Deli Serdang.

Transportation
Medan is connected by road, air, rail and sea.

Airport

The new Kualanamu International Airport (KNO) was opened on 25 July 2013. The new airport is the second largest after Soekarno-Hatta International Airport, with a  passenger terminal and will eventually have a capacity of 50 million passengers (2030). It is Indonesia's first airport with direct rail links to the city. The airport is the hub for Garuda Indonesia, Indonesia AirAsia, Lion Air, Susi Air and Wings Air. The new airport is a replacement for the Polonia Airport. Unlike the old Polonia Airport in the city's heart, this new airport is approximately 39 km (24 mi) from downtown. The airport has direct domestic flights to many major cities in Sumatra and Java—international flights to Malaysia, Singapore, Thailand, Saudi Arabia, Sri Lanka, etc. An airport train known as Kualanamu Airport, Rail Link Services, connects the airport to the city centre. The train runs from Medan Main Station beside the Merdeka Square at Jalan Balai Kota from 4:00 a.m. to 08:00 p.m. and from the airport from 5:25 a.m. to 9:30 p.m. It is the fastest way to reach the airport from the city, taking 30 minutes. Alternate modes of transport from the airport into the city may take longer (30 to 47 minutes).

Seaport

The Port of Belawan (Pelabuhan Belawan) is the principal seaport in Medan. Located on the northeast coast of Sumatra, Belawan is 12 mi (19 km) north of Medan city and serves as a port, the terminus of a railway that crosses the channel south of the island by a bridge.

The port was initially built in 1890 to provide a location where tobacco could be transferred directly between rail lines from the interior and deep-draft ships. The harbour expanded in 1907 by constructing a new section for Chinese and indigenous traders, reserving the existing port for European shipping. In the early twentieth century, the port's business expanded with the growth of significant rubber and palm oil plantations in northern Sumatra. In the 1920s, several major berthing facilities were built. In 1938, the port was the largest in the Dutch East Indies regarding cargo value. Cargo volumes dropped substantially after Indonesian independence and reached pre-independence levels again in the mid-1960s. A major restructuring in 1985 saw the construction of a container terminal; it almost immediately captured about one-fifth of Indonesia's containerized exports. Major products exported include rubber, palm oil, tea, and coffee.

There are two port terminals, one for passenger and ferry services to Penang and Langkawi and some Indonesian cities such as Batam, Jakarta and Surabaya. Another airport, Belawan International Container Terminal (BICT), is used for export and import services. BICT is one of the largest shipping industry ports in Indonesia.

Road and highway

Medan is connected by the Trans-Sumatran Highway, the main road across Sumatra, and the Belawan-Medan-Tanjung Morawa Toll Road, also known as the Belmera Toll Road, connecting Belawan, Medan and Tanjung Morawa. Toll roads have been linked to the city to the airport, Binjai, and Tebing Tinggi.

Railway

Railway lines connect Medan to Binjai and Tanjungpura to the northwest, the port of Belawan to the north, and Tebing Tinggi and Pematang Siantar to the southeast and also Rantau Prapat, among other cities. The largest train station in Medan is Medan Station. There are also smaller stations in Medan, such as Medan Pasar, Pulu Brayan, Titi Papan, Labuhan, and Belawan. Titi Papan and Pulu Brayan only serve as the stop for freight trains carrying oil palm and petroleum. An express train also connects to other North Sumatra cities such as Tebing Tinggi, Pematang Siantar, Tanjungbalai, and Rantau Prapat. An elevated railway is already constructed and operates over several rail lines around Medan to avoid level crossings and reduce traffic congestion.

Long-distance trains from the Medan Station are:
Sri Bilah to Rantau Prapat
Lancang Kuning to Tanjungbalai
Putri Deli to Tanjungbalai
Siantar Express to Pematang Siantar
Sri Lelawangsa commuter rail connects Medan Station to Binjai.

The Kualanamu Airport Railink Services train is an airport express train connecting from Medan Station (City Railway Station – CRS) to Kualanamu International Airport Station (Airport Railink Station – ARS), operated 18 hours (from 5 am to 11 pm) with 30-minute distances. An elevated railway is constructed and working to make this airport rail service 15-minute distances. The CRS provides city check-in services for selected airlines.

Public transport

One of the endangered features of Medan is the motorized rickshaws known as a becak motor (bentor) or becak mesin, although bicycle rickshaws are also available. Becaks are found almost everywhere. Unlike the Javanese rickshaws, the driver sits on the right side of the vehicle and can take its passenger anywhere in the city. The fare to ride a becak is relatively cheap and is usually negotiated beforehand. Ride-sharing services Gojek and Grab are available and widely used for public transportation.

There is also more public transport like taxis, but the locals use minibuses known as sudako or angkutan kota (angkot). Angkots can be found easily on medium-to-high congested roads. Angkots follow their route numbers, usually printed or painted on the vehicle. The routes are not explicitly listed or written but are typically spread on a word-of-mouth basis by the locals.

TransMebidang and Trans Metro Deli are two bus rapid transit system in Medan and its nearby urban areas that has several active corridors:

Trans Mebidang

Trans Metro Deli

Media

Medan serves several radio and TV channels and is also home to newspapers in local and foreign languages such as Indonesian, English, Chinese, Batak, Malay and others.

Television channels
Medan has many television stations; there are public and private national networks and local channels. Local stations, including the public TVRI Sumatera Utara (a regional station serving North Sumatra, which is headquartered in the city) and; as well as a local variation of 
CNN Indonesia
TVRI Medan
Indosiar
MNCTV
Trans TV
ANtv
GTV
RCTI
SCTV
tvOne
Magna TV HD
Metro TV
Trans7
NET. – 43 UHF
iNews – 45 UHF
DAAI TV – 49 UHF
RTV 53 UHF
MYTV – 55 UHF
Kompas TV – 59 UHF
CTV Network - 61 UHF

Radio
RRI Medan is the only public radio in Medan. Several local languages are also served on the radio, such as Kardopa Radio (in the Batak language), CityRadio FM and A-Radio FM (in the Chinese language) and Symphony FM (in the Malay language). Medan also has several popular radio networks and stations like Prambors FM, MNC Trijaya FM, I-Radio, KISS FM, VISI FM, Delta FM and others.

Publications
Several national and local newspapers are available in the city, with Mimbar Umum as the oldest. Major newspapers based in Medan include Waspada, Analisa, Jurnal Medan, Berita Sore, Harian Global, Harian Medan Bisnis, Posmetro Medan, Sinar Indonesia Baru, and Tribun Medan. There is also some national Mandarin newspaper such as Harian Indonesia (印尼星洲日报), Guo Ji Ri Bao (国际日报) and Shangbao (印尼商报). English newspapers like The Jakarta Post are also distributed in the city.

Aplaus Magazine is one of the magazines from the city, published monthly and focuses on food, travel, and inspiration. The magazine is the pioneer of a local magazine that discusses urban lifestyle. First published in 2005, Aplaus Magazine is managed by Analisa daily.

Sport
Football is one of the most popular sports in Medan, with five local clubs: Persatuan Sepakbola Medan dan Sekitarnya (known as PSMS Medan), Medan Jaya, Medan Chiefs, Bintang PSMS and Medan United; and a basketball club named Angsapura Sania. Another locally popular sport is Wushu, with significant growth in recent years as one of the favourite sports in Medan. It has its training centre in Jalan Plaju in the heart of town. Medan has recently seen much success in Wushu nationally and internationally.

Medan has a multi-purpose stadium named Teladan Stadium. This stadium is used primarily for football matches and as a home stadium for PSMS Medan.

Healthcare

Medan has more than 30 registered hospitals. Three of them are public and the rest are private:

Education

As the largest city outside Java island, Medan provides more than 827 registered elementary schools, 337 middle Schools and 288 high schools, including state-owned, private, religious, and international schools. Medan also has 72 registered universities,  academies, polytechnics, and colleges such as:

Elementary, Middle, and High Schools 
Several knowns schools in Medan such as:

Medan was previously the site of the Medan Japanese International School or Medan Japanese School (メダン日本人学校), an overseas school for Japanese children. It was affiliated with the Japanese Consulate General in Medan, and occupied a  building on a  property. It originated as a supplementary school in the consulate's library that opened in April 1972 (Showa 49). A committee to establish a new day school was created in 1978 (Showa 54), and in January 1979 (Showa 55) the school remodeled an existing building for this purpose. The school opened in April 1979. It closed in March 1998.

Universities and Colleges

International relations

Consulates 
Medan host several consulates and general consulates from foreign countries, such as:

Twin towns – sister cities

Medan is twinned with:
 Georgetown, Penang Island, Malaysia (10 October 1984)
 Ichikawa, Chiba Prefecture, Japan (4 November 1989)
 Gwangju, South Jeolla Province, South Korea (24 September 1997)
 Chengdu, Sichuan Province, China (17 December 2002)
 Milwaukee, Wisconsin, United States (30 October 2014)

References

External links

Official Government website 
Medanesia – Medan Forum 

 
Populated places in North Sumatra
Cities in Indonesia
Provincial capitals in Indonesia
Populated places established in 1590